Gustavo Henrique Santos (born 17 October 1999) is a Brazilian professional footballer who plays as a central defender for Botafogo-SP, on loan from Bahia.

Football career
Gustavo Henrique began playing football at the academy of São Paulo and had stints with various Brazilian academies before deciding to apply to colleges in the United States in 2018. He was unable to gain a visa and briefly focused on his studies. He began playing football again and played for various clubs before joining the academy of Atlético Mineiro in November 2019. On 1 October 2020, he signed his first professional contract with the club. He made his professional debut in a 2–1 Campeonato Brasileiro Série A win over Botafogo on 26 November 2020.

On 21 January 2021, Bahia announced the signing of Gustavo Henrique on loan for the 2021 season.

References

External links

Atletico Minerio Profile

1999 births
Living people
People from Catanduva
Brazilian footballers
Association football defenders
Campeonato Brasileiro Série A players
Campeonato Brasileiro Série B players
Clube Atlético Mineiro players
Esporte Clube Bahia players
Footballers from São Paulo (state)